Rocklin   is a community in the Canadian province of Nova Scotia, located in  Pictou County.

References
Rocklin, roadsidethoughts.com. Accessed December 22, 2022.

Communities in Pictou County
General Service Areas in Nova Scotia